Abeshdun ( may refer to:
Abeshdun-e Olya
Abeshdun-e Sofla